Phricta is a genus of insect in the family Tettigoniidae confined to seasonal tropical forests of eastern Australia. It contains the following species:
 Phricta aberrans
 Phricta spinosa 
 Phricta tortuwallina 
 Phricta zwicka

References

 Phricta species

Tettigoniidae genera
Pseudophyllinae